Ted Curson Plays Fire Down Below is an album by American trumpeter Ted Curson which was recorded in 1962 and released on the Prestige label.

Reception

The Allmusic review by Scott Yanow stated, "The main fault of this otherwise superior CD reissue is that there are only 31 minutes of music... Curson, 27 at the time, is heard in top form on one of the very few of his sessions to be reissued ".

Track listing
 "Fire Down Below" (Lester Lee, Ned Washington) - 4:36    
 "The Very Young" (Harold Little, Herb Sacker) - 4:39    
 "Baby Has Gone Bye Bye" (Robert Allen, Allan Roberts) - 4:38    
 "Show Me" (Alan Jay Lerner, Frederick Loewe) - 4:26    
 "Falling in Love With Love" (Lorenz Hart, Richard Rodgers) - 5:29    
 "Only Forever" (Johnny Burke, James V. Monaco) - 6:56

Personnel
Ted Curson - trumpet
Gildo Mahones - piano
George Tucker - bass
Roy Haynes - drums
Montego Joe - congas

References

1963 albums
Prestige Records albums
Ted Curson albums
Albums produced by Ozzie Cadena
Albums recorded at Van Gelder Studio